The 2006 Greek Cup Final was the 62nd final of the Greek Cup. The match took place on 10 May 2006 at Pankritio Stadium. The contestants were Olympiacos and AEK Athens. It was Olympiacos' thirty second Greek Cup Final and third consecutive in their 81 years of existence and AEK Athens' eighteenth Greek Cup Final in their 82-year history.

Venue

This was the first Greek Cup Final held at the Pankritio Stadium.

The Pankritio Stadium was built in 2003. The stadium is used as a venue for Ergotelis and OFI and was used for Greece in 2004. Its current capacity is 26,240.

Background
Olympiacos had qualified for the Greek Cup Final thirty one times, winning twenty one of them. They last had played in a Final in 2005, where they had won Aris, 3–0.

AEK Athens had reached the Greek Cup Final seventeen times, winning eleven of them. They last had played in a Final in 2002, where they had won Olympiacos, 2–1.

Route to the final

Match

Details

See also
2005–06 Greek Football Cup

References

2006
Cup Final
Greek Cup Final 2006
Greek Cup Final 2006
Sport in Heraklion
May 2006 sports events in Europe